Kiskan Rural District is a rural district (dehestan) in the Central District of Baft County, Kerman Province, Iran. At the 2006 census, its population was 2,472, in 720 families. The rural district has 34 villages.

References 

Rural Districts of Kerman Province
Baft County